Women from Headquarters is a 1950 American crime film directed by George Blair and starring Virginia Huston, Barbra Fuller and Frances Charles. The screenplay concerns an ex-Army nurse who retrains as police officer with the LAPD.

The film's sets were designed by the art director James W. Sullivan.

Plot

Cast

References

Bibliography
  Philippa Gates. Detecting Women: Gender and the Hollywood Detective Film. SUNY Press, 2011.

External links
 

1950 films
1950 crime films
American crime films
Films directed by George Blair
Republic Pictures films
American police detective films
American black-and-white films
1950s English-language films
1950s American films